Joe Trasolini (born 1947 or 1948) is a Canadian politician, who  represented the electoral district of Port Moody-Coquitlam in the Legislative Assembly of British Columbia from 2012 to 2013 as a member of the British Columbia New Democratic Party.

He was first elected in a by-election on April 19, 2012. Prior to his election to the legislature, Trasolini served four terms as mayor of Port Moody.

Trasolini immigrated to British Columbia in 1963 from his birthplace in Italy. He graduated from the BCIT Chemical and Metallurgical Engineering Technology Program, and worked in the public and private sector. Since 1985, Trasolini has owned and managed a contracting firm.
 
In 1996 Trasolini was elected to Port Moody City Council, and in 1999 was elected mayor. Trasolini was the first mayor in British Columbia to institute a weekly open door session, an opportunity for constituents to meet with the mayor and raise issues important to them.
 
Trasolini served as a director of Metro Vancouver and on the TransLink Mayor's Council, where he secured funding for the SkyTrain's Evergreen Line expansion.

He was defeated in the 2013 provincial election by Linda Reimer of the BC Liberals.

Electoral record

References

External links
Joe Trasolini (copy archived March 2012)

British Columbia New Democratic Party MLAs
Italian emigrants to Canada
Mayors of places in British Columbia
Living people
1940s births
People from Port Moody
21st-century Canadian politicians
Year of birth uncertain